In a featural writing system, the shapes of the symbols (such as letters) are not arbitrary but encode phonological features of the phonemes that they represent.  The term featural was introduced by Geoffrey Sampson to describe the Korean alphabet and Pitman shorthand.

Joe Martin introduced the term featural notation to describe writing systems that include symbols to represent individual features rather than phonemes. He asserts that "alphabets have no symbols for anything smaller than a phoneme".

A featural script represents finer detail than an alphabet. Here, symbols do not represent whole phonemes, but rather the elements (features) that make up the phonemes, such as voicing or its place of articulation. In the Korean alphabet, the featural symbols are combined into alphabetic letters, and these letters are in turn joined into syllabic blocks, so the system combines three levels of phonological representation.

Some scholars (e.g. John DeFrancis) reject this class or at least labeling the Korean alphabet as such.  Others include stenographies and constructed scripts of hobbyists and fiction writers (such as Tengwar), many of which feature advanced graphic designs corresponding to phonologic properties. The basic unit of writing in these systems can map to anything from phonemes to words. It has been shown that even the Latin script has sub-character "features".

Examples of featural systems
This is a small list of examples of featural writing systems by date of creation. The languages for which each system was developed are also shown.

15th century
Hangul Korean

19th century
Canadian Aboriginal syllabics several Algonquian, Eskimo-Aleut and Athabaskan languages 
Gregg shorthand many languages from different families
Duployan shorthand originally French, later English, German, Spanish, Romanian, Chinook Jargon and others
Visible Speech (a phonetic script) no specific language. Developed to aid the deaf and teach them to speak properly

20th century
Shavian alphabet, Quikscript English
Tengwar (an artificial script invented by J. R. R. Tolkien) fictional languages from Tolkien's novels; Tolkien's invented languages and English
SignWriting sign languages; featural notation
Fonic (a phonetic script) no specific language. Rough equivalent of the International Phonetic Alphabet

21st century
Isibheqe Sohlamvu/Ditema tsa Dinoko Southern Bantu languages

Semi-featural systems
Other scripts may have limited featural elements. Many languages written in the Latin alphabet make use of diacritics, and those letters using diacritics are sometimes considered separate letters within the language's alphabet. The Polish alphabet, for example, indicates a palatal articulation of some consonants with an acute accent. The Turkish alphabet uses the presence of one or two dots above a vowel to indicate that it is a front vowel. The Japanese kana syllabaries indicate voiced consonants with marks known as dakuten. The International Phonetic Alphabet (IPA) also has some featural elements, for example in the hooks and tails that are characteristic of implosives, and retroflex consonants, . The IPA diacritics are also featural. The Fraser alphabet used for Lisu rotates the letters for the tenuis consonants ꓑ , ꓔ , ꓝ , ꓚ , and ꓗ  180° to indicate aspiration.

See also
 Abugida
 Abjad
 Syllabary

References

Writing systems